Oglodak Island is an island in the U.S. State of Alaska. It is located in the Aleutians West Census Area, which encompasses most of the Aleutian Island chain.

References 

Andreanof Islands
Uninhabited islands of Alaska
Islands of Alaska
Islands of Unorganized Borough, Alaska